Chowronghee is a novel by Bengali author Sankar. First published in Bengali in 1962, the novel became a bestseller and was translated into a number of Indian languages and made into a film and a play. It is considered arguably Sankar's most popular book, a classic novel in Bengali. The novel, translated into English by Arunava Sinha, won the Vodafone Crossword Book Award 2007 for the best translation. The novel was shortlisted for Independent Foreign Fiction Prize in 2010.

Plot summary
Sankar named his novel Chowringhee as the novel is set in Chowringhee, a neighborhood in Calcutta, in the mid-1950s. The narrator, Shankar, an ambitious young man who was previously a secretary of an English barrister becomes unemployed as the Barrister dies all of a sudden and he is forced to sell wastepaper baskets door to door. Once, as he takes rest in a neighborhood park, reminiscing about his past and fearful of what awaits him in future, Byron,a friend of his passes by and is shocked by Shankar's descent into poverty. He finds Shankar a job at the Shahjahan Hotel, one of the city's oldest and most venerable hotels.

Shankar is soon befriended by Sata Bose, the hotel's chief receptionist, and after a brief stint as a typist, Shankar becomes Bose's main assistant and close confidant. The manager Marco Polo who is feared by all likes him as well, and the young Shankar is given more responsibilities. The story of the novel spins around the guests, entertainers, and frequent visitors of the Shahjahan, but several members of the hotel staff get equal importance in Shankar's narrative. We learn about the seamy underside of the elite of Calcutta, whose greed, shady deals, and shameful behaviors are initially shocking to our naïve young man, who soon becomes jaded and disgusted by them. The poverty of working and jobless Calcuttans is vividly portrayed, as those not in the upper echelon are only one stroke of bad luck away from living in the streets or in dilapidated hovels. Love is a central theme, amongst the guests and workers, with often tragic results.

References

1962 novels
Bengali-language literature
Indian Bengali-language novels
1962 Indian novels
Indian novels adapted into films